Kemba may refer to:

Kemba (woreda), region in Ethiopia
Kemba, Estonia, village
Kemba (rapper) (born 1990), American musical artist

People with the given name Kemba
Kemba Nelson (born 2000), Jamaican sprinter
Kemba Walker (born 1990), American basketball player

See also
Kimba (disambiguation)